The Ballet Guild was a wartime English ballet company formed on May 10, 1941, by Deryck Lynham, the barrister Christmas Humphreys (who acted as chairman) and others, based in St John's Wood, London. It was formed to encourage the development of ballet as an art, and to provide opportunities for young dancers and creative artists. The Guild set up a ballet school, assembled a library of resources, and organised lectures, demonstrations and exhibitions. The company was short-lived, and had closed its doors by 1946. At that time there were a dozen or more small ballet groups touring the UK and vying for audiences, including the Arts Theatre Ballet, the London Ballet and the International Ballet.

The Guild put on short experimental seasons and toured under ENSA using ad-hoc companies assembled by the dancers and choreographers Molly Lake (1900-1986) and her husband Travis Kemp (1914-1995). Lake and Kemp had both previously been in the Pavlova and Markova-Dolin companies, and Lake was an exponent of the Cecchetti method. A quintet, later an orchestra, was formed by Leighton Lucas to provide the music. Most of the London performances took place at the Rudolf Steiner Hall near Baker Street or the Garrick Theatre in Charing Cross Road.

One of the company's earliest productions was the new ballet Sawdust, music by Mary Lucas, which was performed in London and Wolverhampton in May 1941 under the direction of Leighton Lucas.
Other ballets produced under the Guild included Victorian Bouquet (choreographed by Lake, music by Rossini), Nymphenburg Gardens (Lake, Mozart), and The Last Curtain (Lake, Weber), all three of which were televised just after the war by the Embassy Ballet (later the Continental Ballet), an offshoot of the Ballet Guild.

The Guild's library was used as the foundation for the Archives of the Dance, initially established under the chairmanship of Cyril Beaumont in 1946. This later became the dance holdings of the Theatre Museum, London, and is now at the Victoria & Albert Museum. In 1954 Molly Lake and Travis Kemp took up an appointment to teach and direct the Turkish National Ballet School (which the Turkish Government has asked Ninette de Valois to establish), at which they worked for the next two decades.

References

Ballet in the United Kingdom
Ballet companies in the United Kingdom
History of ballet
Dance companies in the United Kingdom
Performing groups established in 1941